Prelog is a Croatian and Slovenian surname. Notable people with the surname include:

 Matej Prelog (born 1980), Slovenian rower
 Vladimir Prelog, Croatian chemist, 1975 Nobel Prize laureate

References

Croatian surnames
Slovene-language surnames